Van Nickert (born May 14, 1952) is an American football coach.  He is currently as assistant football coach at Kalamazoo College, where has served since 1983.  Nickert was the head football coach at Kalamazoo for one season in 2004.

Coaching career
Nickert was the head football coach at Kalamazoo College located in Kalamazoo, Michigan.  He held that position for the 2004 season. His coaching record at Kalamazoo was 1–9.

Head coaching record

References

External links
 Kalamazoo profile

1952 births
Living people
Kalamazoo Hornets football coaches
Western Michigan University alumni